The 2008–09 Adelaide United FC season was the club's fourth A-League season since the inception in the Australian football league since it first started in 2005. The club competed in the 2008–09 A-League, 2008 AFC Champions League and 2008 FIFA Club World Cup.

For the 2008–09 season, Adelaide United made some significant signings to strengthen the squad, most notably striker Cristiano from Willem II for two years on a free transfer. Another key signing to fill the vacancy left by the retirement of Richie Alagich was Alemão formerly of CA Juventus. Saša Ognenovski joined the club from Queensland Roar to help shore up the defence, midfielder Paul Reid joined from Brighton & Hove Albion F.C., while promising youngsters Scott Jamieson, Daniel Mullen, Mark Birighitti and Robert Younis also signed. Bobby Petta, Shaun Ontong, Milan Susak, Dez Giraldi and Robert Bajic were all released, Bruce Djite was sold for an A-League record of A$850,000 to Genclerbirligi, whilst Nathan Burns also transferred to pursue his European dreams, joining Greek first division outfit AEK Athens for A$500,000. Kristian Sarkies, Lucas Pantelis and Fabian Barbiero all had their contracts renewed.

This season, Adelaide United passed the one millionth spectator milestone of total crowds since the inception of the A-League. They reached this achievement when their 7,052nd fan passed through the gate, for the Round 3 match against Wellington. Adelaide United are only the third A-League club to do so thus far, the other two being Melbourne Victory and Sydney FC.

The round 18 A-League match against Sydney FC at the Adelaide Oval saw $23,002 donated to the Starlight Foundation as $1 from every ticket sold for the match went to the charity.

By the end of round 27, Adelaide had drawn level for first, equalling Melbourne's 38 points on the ladder, having needed to win 2–0 against the Central Coast Mariners away to win the premiership and only securing a 1–0 win. Adelaide was pushed down to second because of goal difference. The Reds, along with Melbourne, the Queensland Roar and Central Coast, proceeded to the finals where they lost 1–0 against Melbourne Victory in the grand final at Etihad Stadium, Melbourne.

An early highlight for the season was Adelaide's run to the final of the AFC Champions League against Gamba Osaka. Because of this performance, Adelaide participated in the 2008 FIFA Club World Cup. They played in the play-off round against Waitakere United on 11 December, defeating them 2–1. The Reds' next game was played against AFC Champions League rivals, Gamba Osaka, in the quarterfinal round on 14 December in Toyota, Japan. This match, despite Adelaide's grown skill since their first meeting with ACL champions, was won by Gamba Osaka 0–1. Adelaide's last appearance in the Club World Cup was against Al Ahly, from Egypt, to determine the fifth-placed club. The match was played on 18 December, and Adelaide defeated Al-Ahly 0–1.

This season also saw the introduction of the Adelaide United W-League team and the A-League National Youth League team. Former Adelaide player Richie Alagich, along with Michael Barnett and former Socceroos Tony Vidmar and Joe Mullen joined the coaching staff of these teams.

Players

Squad information

First Team roster

Youth Team roster

Transfers

First Team

In

Out

Youth Team

In

Out

Technical staff

Statistics

Squad statistics

1 – does not include own goal(s)
* – player(s) who competed in the ACL but not in the 2008–09 A-League season or the CWC
** – player(s) who competed in the CWC but not in the 2008–09 A-League season or the ACL

Goal scorers

Attendance at home games

Competitions

Pre-season

A-League

League table

Matches

Finals series

FIFA Club World Cup

References

External links
 Official website
 AFC Champions League

Adelaide United FC seasons
Adelaide United